Thomas Brahaney (born October 23, 1951) is a former American football center who played nine seasons in the National Football League (NFL) for the St. Louis Cardinals.

He played college football at Oklahoma, where he was an All-American. In 1971, he anchored the Sooners NCAA record breaking Wishbone offense that averaged over 472 yards per game and whose only loss was 35-31, to eventual national champion Nebraska in the Game of the Century. In 2007, he was inducted into the College Football Hall of Fame.

References

1951 births
Living people
All-American college football players
American football offensive linemen
College Football Hall of Fame inductees
Oklahoma Sooners football players
St. Louis Cardinals (football) players